Brasilândia do Tocantins is a municipality located in the Brazilian state of Tocantins. Its population was 2,211 (2020) and its area is 641 km².

References

Municipalities in Tocantins